Cyprus brandy is a variety of brandy made on the Mediterranean island of Cyprus.

History

The production of brandy on Cyprus began in 1871 by ETKO (the oldest surviving distiller on the island) following their importation of a pot still from Cognac in 1868. Data coming from the English explorer Samuel Baker revealed that in 1875 the volume of "native brandy" produced in the Limassol District alone amounted to 467,711 okes.

Distinguishing characteristics

Cypriot brandy is popular among locals and dozens of companies (mostly in the Limassol district) currently distill it. It differs from other European varieties in that its alcohol concentration is 32%, although there are some that are stronger, such as Keo Five Kings at 40%. Most varieties have a distinctly sweet aftertaste.

Production method

Cyprus brandy is typically produced by double distillation of xynisteri-based white wines with aging in oak barrels.

Use in mixed drinks

Cypriot brandy forms the base for the Brandy Sour cocktail, in addition to locally produced lemon cordial, that has been cited as the national drink of Cyprus.

References

Brandies
Brandy